Hi, Mom is a 2021 Chinese comedy film written and directed by Jia Ling and starring Jia Ling, Shen Teng, Chen He, and Zhang Xiaofei. It was released on 12 February 2021 (Chinese New Year). The film's themes include familial love, maternal love, and filial piety. The film has grossed US$848 million at the box office, making it the third-highest-grossing film of 2021, the third-highest-grossing non-English film of all time, and the highest-grossing film by a solo female director. The film received positive reviews, with word of mouth contributing to its popularity.

Plot
After her mother Li Huanying is fatally injured in a car accident in 2001, grief-stricken Jia Xiaoling finds herself transported back in time to the year 1981, where she becomes her mother's close friend. Jia Xiaoling feels that she has not been a good enough daughter in the present, so back in 1981, she does all she can to make Li Huanying happy, including setting her up with a factory manager's son, Shen Guanglin, in the hope of giving her mother a better husband, a better daughter, and a better life than she had the first time around.

Cast

Production
Hi, Mom is Jia Ling's directorial debut. She spent more than three years writing the script with her co-writers, and production started on 25 September 2019. It was filmed on location at factories in Jia Ling's hometown of Xiangyang, Hubei.

It is also based on stories of Jia Ling's own mother, also named Li Huanying, who died in 2001 shortly after Jia started college. Jia made the film as a tribute to her mother.

The film's Chinese title literally means "Hello, Li Huanying" rather than "Hi, Mom". When asked about this difference, Jia Ling said that a mother is not just a mother, but her own person too.

Advance publicity

On September 25, 2019, Jia Ling published a post announcing the launch of the movie Hi, Mom.

On January 7, 2020, the film was announced. On October 29, the film was announced to be scheduled for release on Lunar New Year's Day (February 12) 2021. On December 16, the studio released a trailer titled "What kind of family is this?" On December 24, the studio released posters of Jia Ling, Shen Teng and Zhang Xiaofei. On December 25, the film released a promotional video titled "Where are you going, Dad". On December 31, the studio released the music video for the promotional song "Little Girl Under the Street Lamp".

Reception

Box office 
Hi, Mom was released on 12 February 2021, and in its first weekend it grossed US$195 million (RMB 1.26 billion). The film's popularity grew through word of mouth, and on 15 February its single-day box office total was US$80 million, surpassing Detective Chinatown 3. By 16 February, the film had grossed more than RMB 1.8 billion, making Jia Ling the highest-grossing woman director in Chinese box office history (the previous record was RMB 1.36 billion for Us and Them, directed by Rene Liu). On 21 February the film's cumulative box office total surpassed Detective Chinatown 3, making it the highest-grossing film of the 2021 Chinese New Year holiday period. On 6 March, its gross reached 5.04 billion RMB, surpassing 2019's Nezha to become the second-highest-grossing film of all time in China. In late March, the film's gross surpassed Wonder Woman (2017) to become the highest-grossing film by a solo female director of all time. At noon on March 10, the total box office exceeded RMB 5.15 billion, equivalent to more than US$785 million, surpassing the 99th "Deadpool" (US$783 million) at the global box office and officially entered the top 100 at the global box office. On March 20, the box office revenue exceeded 5.3 billion, making Jia Ling the highest-grossing female director in the world.

Though it was originally planned to be shown in theaters until March 15, 2021, the film's run was extended to April 11 and then later to May.

International release 
On March 14, 2021, the film's crew announced plans for international release.

Critical response 
The film received positive reviews and higher ratings from viewers than the other major films released at the same time. As of 16 February 2021, the film's rating out of 10 is 8.2 on Douban, 9.5 on Maoyan, and 9.3 on Taopiaopiao. It has won praise for its authentic emotions and its portrayal of 1980s Xiangyang. Audiences found the film moving; many were moved to tears, and some called their families soon after leaving the theater. According to critic Lim Yian Lu, "despite this being Jia Ling’s directorial debut, it is on par with the work of an experienced director".

Cai Jianya wrote that the film's release had resonated with viewers. Due to the COVID-19 pandemic, many people had not traveled home to see their families for Chinese New Year in 2021, and some chose to watch a film about family as a result.

Accolades

References

External links 

 Hello, Li Huanying (in Chinese), 2016 sketch that the film is based on

Films set in 1981
Films set in 2001
2021 directorial debut films
Chinese comedy films
2021 comedy films
Films about mother–daughter relationships
Films about time travel
Films about dreams
Films shot in Hubei